Ignacio Schor (born 4 August 2000) is an Argentine professional footballer who plays as an attacking midfielder for Platense.

Career
Prior to his departure to Platense in 2015, Schor spent three years at River Plate and six months at San Lorenzo. He signed his first professional contract on 13 November 2020. Schor made his senior debut under manager Juan Manuel Llop on 28 November in a Primera Nacional win away to Atlanta, with the midfielder winning a penalty that Joaquín Susvielles would convert. In his second appearance, on 5 December against Deportivo Morón, Schor scored his first goal. He made eight further appearances in 2020, which the club ended with promotion. He made his Primera División bow versus Argentinos Juniors on 21 February.

Career statistics
.

Notes

References

External links

2000 births
Living people
Footballers from Buenos Aires
Argentine people of German descent
Argentine footballers
Association football midfielders
Primera Nacional players
Argentine Primera División players
Club Atlético Platense footballers